Tornado Mart is a men's clothing retailer in Japan that is primarily located within Marui shopping centers across that country. The flagship store is in the upscale Omotesando area. Tornado Mart is known for narrow waisted jackets, tight jeans which flare from the knee and glamorously decorated fabrics. It has a customer base primarily of thin, fashion-conscious young men. There is also a women's line called "Tornado Mart Femme".

Clothing retailers of Japan